Lotoria is a genus of predatory sea snails, marine gastropod mollusks in the family Cymatiidae.

Species
Species within the genus Lotoria include:
 Lotoria armata (G.B. Sowerby III, 1897)
 Lotoria grandimaculata (Reeve, 1844)
 Lotoria lotoria (Linnaeus, 1758)
 Lotoria perryi (Emerson & Old, 1963)

References

External links
 Emerson W.K. & Old W.E. (1963). A new subgenus and species of Cymatium (Mollusca, Gastropoda). American Museum Novitates. 2137: 1-13.

Cymatiidae